Desjardins Insurance is the insurance unit of Desjardins Group, the largest association of credit unions in Canada. Desjardins Insurance has two principal subsidiaries: Desjardins Financial Security (life, health and retirement insurance products) and Desjardins General Insurance (auto, home and business insurance products).

History 
The first subsidiary of Desjardins Group was created in 1944 under the name of "Société d'assurance des caisses populaires" (SACP). SACP is today known under the name of DGI, Desjardins General Insurance. In 1948, Desjardins Life Insurance (today known as Desjardins Financial Security) was also created. Both companies saw their activities flourish quickly in a post-war and prosperity environment, and regrouped under the common name of Desjardins Insurance.

In 2015, Desjardins Insurance acquired the Canadian operations of U.S.-based insurer State Farm, which helped Desjardins become the second biggest property and casualty insurer in Canada, and first in Ontario. This acquisition almost doubled the premiums, going from 2 billion to 4 billion. 50% of their volume now comes from State Farm, but other parts also come from Desjardin's group insurance (The Personal), from white labels activities with Scotia Bank, from brokerage with Western Financial and finally from activities related to the exclusive agents of Quebec. In 2018, State Farm Canada was officially rebranded to Desjardins Insurance through Desjardins Insurance Agents. The whole transition is to be completed by December 31, 2019.

Desjardins Insurance was the first insurance company to widely offer UBI savings program in Ontario and Quebec, and is now a leading provider of this kind of product.

See also 

Lévis
Desjardins Group
Desjardins General Insurance
Desjardins Financial Security

References 

Desjardins Group
Financial services companies established in 1944
Insurance companies of Canada
Canadian companies established in 1944
Companies based in Lévis, Quebec